The Asia/Oceania Zone was one of the three zones of the regional Davis Cup competition in 1998.

In the Asia/Oceania Zone there were four different tiers, called groups, in which teams competed against each other to advance to the upper tier. The top two teams in Group III advanced to the Asia/Oceania Zone Group II in 1999, whereas the bottom two teams were relegated to the Asia/Oceania Zone Group IV in 1999.

Participating nations

Draw
 Venue: National Centre, Kuala Lumpur, Malaysia
 Date: 15–19 April

Group A

Group B

1st to 4th place play-offs

5th to 8th place play-offs

Final standings

  and  promoted to Group II in 1999.
  and  relegated to Group IV in 1999.

Round robin

Group A

Kazakhstan vs. Sri Lanka

Singapore vs. Syria

Kazakhstan vs. Singapore

Sri Lanka vs. Syria

Kazakhstan vs. Syria

Singapore vs. Sri Lanka

Group B

Malaysia vs. Kuwait

Saudi Arabia vs. Tajikistan

Malaysia vs. Saudi Arabia

Kuwait vs. Tajikistan

Malaysia vs. Tajikistan

Saudi Arabia vs. Kuwait

1st to 4th place play-offs

Semifinals

Kazakhstan vs. Tajikistan

Sri Lanka vs. Malaysia

Final

Kazakhstan vs. Sri Lanka

3rd to 4th play-off

Tajikistan vs. Malaysia

5th to 8th place play-offs

5th to 8th play-offs

Syria vs. Kuwait

Saudi Arabia vs. Singapore

5th to 6th play-off

Syria vs. Saudi Arabia

7th to 8th play-off

Kuwait vs. Singapore

References

External links
Davis Cup official website

Davis Cup Asia/Oceania Zone
Asia Oceania Zone Group III